Madalena e Beselga is a civil parish in the municipality of Tomar, Portugal. It was formed in 2013 by the merger of the former parishes Madalena and Beselga. The population in 2011 was 3,990, in an area of 44.44 km².

References

Freguesias of Tomar